The Ariadne J. and Mary A. Borden House is a historic house located at 92 Globe Street in Fall River, Massachusetts.

Description and history 
It is a two-story, wood-framed structure designed in the Second Empire style, complete with a mansard roof pierced by dormers, paired sawn brackets at the eaves, and a single-story bracketed porch. It was built in 1882 for Ariadne and Mary Borden, sisters who were both principals of grammar schools (and distant relations to Lizzie Borden's father). The structure is considered one of the best examples of a small two-story mansard cottage in the city.

It was added to the National Register of Historic Places on February 16, 1983.

See also
National Register of Historic Places listings in Fall River, Massachusetts

References

Houses in Fall River, Massachusetts
National Register of Historic Places in Fall River, Massachusetts
Houses on the National Register of Historic Places in Bristol County, Massachusetts
Second Empire architecture in Massachusetts
Houses completed in 1882